The governor of Bryansk Oblast is the highest official of Bryansk Oblast, a federal subject of Russia. The governor heads the executive branch in the region and is elected by direct popular vote for the term of five years.

History of office 
The first post-Soviet head of Bryansk Oblast was Vladimir Barabanov, people's deputy of the RSFSR, deputy chairman of the Navlinsky District council and presidential representative in the region. On 14 December 1991, he took the position of acting Head of Administration, and he was approved in office a month later.

In April 1993 Barabanov lost the first gubernatorial elections to Communist people's deputy Yury Lodkin. Five months later, during the final stage of the 1993 Russian constitutional crisis Lodkin expressed his support to the Supreme Soviet and anti-Yeltsinist forces. He was sacked by president on 25 September, and governor's office was stormed by the police. For the next three years Yury Lodkin unsuccessfully contested his removal in courts. The next governor-appointee Vladimir Karpov fell in the summer of 1995, as a result of conflict between his alleged patron businessman Oleg Kibalchich and other powerful figures in the region.

Vladimir Barabanov was appointed again, but his second reign did not last long. In May 1996 an address of pro-Yeltsin Bryansk politicians appeared, in which Barabanov was accused of disloyalty to the federal government, close cooperation with the Communists and Lodkin. Barabanov allegedly created "a situation for the defeat of democracy", meaning possible low results of Yeltsin in Bryansk Oblast in the upcoming presidential election. Barabanov's deputy and successor Alexander Semernyov was defeated by Lodkin in December 1996. In 2000, Lodkin's main competitors were businessmen Nikolay Denin and Yury Dyomochkin. Lodkin received 29% of the vote and was declared winner as the first-past-the-post system was used that year.

In 2004 Yury Lodkin was nominated for a third term with support from Communist and Agrarian parties, but he was removed from registration "for abuse of office". Lodkin linked his removing from ballot with his Communist Party membership. He accused the United Russia party of “unwillingness to win legally” and called his supporters to vote against all. Nikolay Denin was elected next governor of Bryansk Oblast.

In 2007, Denin was appointed for a second term, as gubernatorial elections were not held in Russia from 2005 to 2012. After reform of the federal legislature, Bryansk Oblast became one of the five regions to hold elections in 2012. On 5 October Denin was removed from ballot due to invalid signatures of his supporters' submitted to the election commission. Six days later, the decision of the regional court was canceled by the Supreme Court, and United Russia's candidate successfully re-elected on 14 October. In 2014, Denin was dismissed by Vladimir Putin due to the "loss of president's trust."

List of officeholders

References

Sources 

Politics of Bryansk Oblast
 
Bryansk